John Bragg may refer to:

John Bragg (politician) (1806–1878), United States politician
John Bragg (businessman) (born 1940), Canadian businessman
John Bragg (climber), United States rock climber and alpine climber
Johnny Bragg, musician with The Prisonaires